Anything for Bread is a 1991 Spanish film directed by Enrique Urbizu and written by Luis Marías.

Premise
The film centres on an armed robbery within a bingo hall, within a background in the underworld of drug dealing, sexual perversion, police corruption and a political assassination. Woven through this are the stories of two very different women from opposite backgrounds. Azucena is a robber fleeing the scene when she is picked up by a young woman, Verónica. Both are vulnerable, having been threatened and betrayed, and soon start fighting against each other to gain the proceeds of the robbery. As they get to know each other, they develop a mutual respect, and this helps them fight the dangerous men who are chasing them. The two women eventually become sisters-in-arms and keep the stolen money.

Cast

Production
The director used Álex de la Iglesia's graphic work for production design.

It was filmed in Bilbao, Bakio, Santurce, Okondo, Getaria, Gipuzkoa and Arrieta, in the Basque region of Spain. The city of Bilbao gave the film a neo-noir look with a post modern-twist.

Awards and nominations

Won
Goya Awards
Best Supporting Actress (Kiti Manver)

Nominated
Goya Awards
Best Original Score (Bernardo Bonezzi)
Best Screenplay – Original (Luis Marías)
Best Special Effects (Kit West)

Reception
It has also been called "a satisfactory thriller".

One reviewer noted that the film was "a strange mixture of thriller and comedy", it has "great set pieces" but an "excessively jumbled script". It is an "irregular but sympathetic product".

References

External links

1991 films
1990s Spanish-language films
Spanish crime films
1990s Spanish films